Samantha Jo Prudhomme (born October 25, 1993) is an American soccer coach and former professional player who is an assistant coach for the Loyola Greyhounds women's soccer team.

Prudhomme played as a goalkeeper for Reign FC, Washington Spirit, Houston Dash, and Boston Breakers in the National Women's Soccer League (NWSL).

Early life 
Born in Torrance, CA and raised in Aliso Viejo, California, Prudhomme attended Aliso Niguel High School, where she lettered all four years and started her Junior and Senior seasons, became the MVP and Team Captain for both years.  Her senior year she led her team to a CIF championship, State Championship and ranked #1 high school school soccer team by ESPN. Won CIF women's soccer player of the year 2012. She is the daughter of Jon and Jo Beth Prudhomme, and has one brother, Nick.

Prudhomme attended Aliso Niguel High School, where she lettered all four years and started her Junior and Senior seasons, became the MVP and Team Captain for both years.  Her senior year she led her team to a CIF championship, State Championship and ranked #1 high school school soccer team by ESPN. Prudhomme was named CIF women's soccer player of the year 2012, as well as, Orange County Register's Player of the Year 2012.

College career

Oregon State, 2012–2013 
Prudhomme began her college career as an Oregon State Beaver in 2012. During her two seasons with the Beavers, Prudhomme played a total of 31 matches, giving up 41 goals, producing 188 saves, and had a combined record of 11–15–5.

USC Trojans, 2014–2016 
Prudhomme transferred to the University of Southern California after her Sophomore season at Oregon State, having been recruited by USC, and citing frustration with the Oregon State program.  During her first season with the program she helped convert USC into a top PAC-12 team At the beginning of second season she captured ESPNW Player of the week honors Combined seasons with USC, Prudhomme played a total of 48 matches, allowing 27 total goals, producing 175 saves, 25 shutouts, and led the Trojans to the NCAA Championship in her senior season.  That year, she was named the 2016 Pac-12 Goalkeeper of the Year, and to the Pac-12 First Team.

Club career

PALI Blues, 2014
Team Won National Championship and Prudhomme won W-league Goalkeeper with lowest GAA for the W-league's last season 2014

So Cal FC, 2015
Prudhomme lead team to the Finals in their first season as a WPSL team

Boston Breakers, 2017 
Prudhomme was selected by the Boston Breakers with the 31st overall pick in the 2017 NWSL College Draft. She signed with the team on April 4, 2017. Prudhomme started five games in her rookie year, filling in for starting goalkeeper Abby Smith when she was injured. She helped the Breakers stop a seven-game losing streak. Prudhomme was the first Breaker to record three consecutive shutouts and broke the club record for shutout minutes.

Houston Dash, 2018 
After the Breakers folded ahead of the 2018 NWSL season, the NWSL held a dispersal draft to distribute Breakers players across the league. Her rights were selected 24th overall by the Houston Dash. Prudhomme didn't appear in any games for Houston in 2018 as Jane Campbell played every minute of the season in goal.

Prudhomme was waived by the Houston Dash prior to the 2019 NWSL season so she could join the Washington Spirit preseason camp as a non-roster invitee.

Washington Spirit, 2019
Prudhomme was named to Washington's final roster ahead of the 2019 NWSL season.

Reign FC, 2019
On July 15, 2019, Prudhomme was acquired by Reign FC in a trade with Washington Spirit in exchange for Elise Kellond-Knight.

On February 13, 2020, Prudhomme announced her retirement from professional soccer.

References

External links 
 Boston Breakers player profile
 Oregon State player profile

Living people
1993 births
Boston Breakers draft picks
Boston Breakers players
Houston Dash players
USC Trojans women's soccer players
Oregon State Beavers women's soccer players
Soccer players from California
American women's soccer players
National Women's Soccer League players
Women's association football goalkeepers
Sportspeople from Aliso Viejo, California
Aliso Niguel High School alumni
Washington Spirit players
OL Reign players